B. R. Deepak is an Indian sinologist. He  is the first Indian to receive China's highest literary award.

Biography
Deepak studied at Peking University in Beijing, China from 1991 to 1993, and in 1996 studied as a Jawaharlal Nehru Fellow at the Chinese Academy of Social Sciences in Beijing. He obtained his PhD in Chinese history and language in 1998 from the Jawaharlal Nehru University in New Delhi, India, and studied for a MBA at the Lancaster University Management School in England from 2001 to 2002. He is currently a Professor of Chinese at the Center of Chinese and Southeast Asian Studies at Jawaharlal Nehru University. He is best known for his books on Sino-Indian relations and Chinese to English and Hindi translations. He was also the editor of a Chinese-Hindi dictionary. He has been a visiting fellow at the Chinese Academy of Social Sciences, visiting professor at Tianjin Foreign Studies University, China, Beijing Language University, China; Doon University, Dehradun India, and Teaching Fellow at the Scottish Centre of Chinese Studies in the University of Edinburgh, UK.

Works
 2001. India-China Relations in first half of the Twentieth Century. New Delhi: APH Publishers. 
 2003. Chinese-Hindi Dictionary (汉印词典, Chini-Hindi Shavda kosh). New Delhi: Ministry of Human Resource and Development.
 2005. India & China 1904-2004: A Century of Peace and Conflict. Manak Publications Pvt. Ltd. 
 2006. My Life with Kotnis. Manak Publications Pvt. Ltd. 
 2009. Chini Kavita: 11vin Shatabdi Isa Poorv Se 14vin Shatabdi Tak. Prakashan Sansthan. 
 2010. Agriculture, Countryside and Peasants. Manak Publications Pvt. Ltd. 
 2012. India-China Relations: Future Perspectives. Vij Books, New Delhi 
 2012. India-China Relations: A Civilizational Perspective. Manak, New Delhi 
 2015. India and China - Foreign Policy Approaches and Responses. Vij Books India Pvt Ltd, 
 2020. India and China: Beyond the Binary of Friendship and Enmity. Springer Singapore

Awards
 2011. Special Book Award For Translation of Chinese Classical Poetry into Hindi by the Government of China.
 2006. Asia Fellow Award For conducting research on China's Agrarian Issues at the Rural Development Institute of the Chinese     Academy of Social Sciences, China by Asia Scholarship Foundation, Bangkok, Thailand.
 2003. Post Doctoral Fellowship By the University of Edinburgh, Scotland, UK.
 1996. Nehru Fellow Award For doctoral studies at the Graduate Training College of the Chinese Academy of Social Sciences, China by the Nehru Memorial Museum and Library, New Delhi India.
 1991. India-China Cultural Exchange Fellowship For advanced studies in Chinese History and Civilization at Peking University, China by the Government of India and China.

References

External links
 Deepak's page at Jawaharlal Nehru University

Indian sinologists
Living people
Year of birth missing (living people)

He has a wife and two sons, namely Yao Deepak and Jay and Hans Deepak.